Tami Grende (born 22 June 1997, in Denpasar) is an Indonesian tennis player of Italian descent.
As a junior, Grende had a career-high world ranking of 36, achieved on January 19, 2015.

Playing for Indonesia at the Fed Cup, Grende had a win–loss record of 0–3.

Early and personal life 

Tami Grende was born in Denpasar, Bali, Indonesia. Her father, Olivier, is an entrepreneur, and her mother, Luh, is a homemaker. Tami has two siblings, Ayu and Paz.

Tami graduated high school from CHIS, a school which she attended since the first grade. She then went to graduate with a communications degree from the University of Washington in Seattle, Washington.

Junior Grand Slam finals

Doubles: 1 (1 title)

ITF Junior finals

Singles: 8 (4 titles, 4 runner-ups)

Doubles: 7 (6 titles, 1 runner-up)

References

External links 
 
 
 

1997 births
Living people
People from Denpasar
Indonesian female tennis players
Wimbledon junior champions
Grand Slam (tennis) champions in girls' doubles